Daniel Ojambo Adongo (born ) is a Kenyan sportsman. He moved to South Africa in 2007 to join the ' rugby academy and played professional rugby union in South Africa and New Zealand between 2011 and 2013. He then converted to American football, joining the Indianapolis Colts as an outside linebacker until 2015. He is currently a free agent.

Rugby union

As a rugby player, he plays either as a lock or a flanker, and last played Super Rugby for the Southern Kings in the 2013 Super Rugby season.

Youth
In Kenya, he joined the Kenya Harlequins junior team. He was spotted by South African scouts at the 2006 Safari Sevens tournament, playing in the schools category for School. In 2007, he joined to the  academy. He progressed from Under–19 level in 2008 to Under–21 level in 2010.

Sharks
He was included in the  squad for the 2010 Vodacom Cup, but failed to play in any matches. He made a total of ten appearances in that competition, scoring three tries. He was also included in the  squad for the 2011 Currie Cup Premier Division, but failed to feature in that competition.

Blue Bulls
He made eight appearances for them in the 2012 Vodacom Cup, but he was then released from his contract after just six months to join New Zealand ITM Cup team .

Counties Manukau
He joined  prior to the 2012 ITM Cup. He made his debut against  and played in eight matches for them on their way to winning the Championship and subsequent promotion to the Premiership. However, he wasn't named in their 2013 squad.

Kings
One more substitute appearance in the home victory over the  followed, as well as playing the opening match of the 2013 Currie Cup First Division season, but his season then came to a premature end following a torn bicep injury.

Varsity Cup

International

American football
On 25 July 2013, the NFL's Indianapolis Colts announced that they signed Adongo as an outside linebacker despite the fact that he had no prior American football experience. After spending time as a member of the Colts' practice squad, Adongo was added to the Colts' active roster on 3 December 2013. Adongo appeared in two games for the Colts in 2013, but did not record a tackle.

On 7 August 2014, Adongo received a bicep injury during a pre-season game, and was waived with the injury designation by the Colts the following day. When he cleared waivers, he reverted to the Indianapolis Colts' injured reserve.

On 5 September 2015, Adongo was waived by the Colts. He was signed to the practice squad the following day. Adongo was elevated to the active roster on 12 November. He was waived again on 17 December 2015 after law enforcement personnel received at least two reports of possible domestic violence between Adongo and an unidentified female.

Life after sport
Adongo's father has expressed concern about difficulties his son was experiencing after his sports career ended.

References

External links
 Indianapolis Colts bio

Living people
1989 births
Rugby union flankers
Kenyan rugby union players
Southern Kings players
Sharks (Currie Cup) players
Blue Bulls players
Sportspeople from Nairobi
Kenyan expatriate rugby union players
Expatriate rugby union players in New Zealand
Kenyan expatriate sportspeople in New Zealand
Expatriate rugby union players in South Africa
Kenyan expatriate sportspeople in South Africa
University of Pretoria alumni
Kenyan expatriate sportspeople in the United States
American football linebackers
Indianapolis Colts players
Kenyan players of American football
Footballers who switched code
Rugby union players that played in the NFL
Alumni of Strathmore School